A country lane is a narrow road in the countryside.

In North America and Australia, the term "lane" also may refer to rear access roads which act as a secondary vehicular network in cities and towns. Some towns and cities in the United Kingdom, including the City of London, also name some minor streets and passageways as a "Lane". However, the more usual British usage of the term "lane" is for a narrow road with little vehicular traffic in the countryside, within or between villages, and these can be named or remain unnamed.

Because country lanes are typically "single lane" or "single track" (that is, the paved road is not wide enough for two vehicles to pass) there will usually be official or unofficial passing places along the route for traffic to pass safely.

See also 

 Dirt road
 Gravel road
 Green lane
 Single-track road
 Sunken lane

References

Types of roads
Types of streets